South Carolina Highway 327 (SC 327) is a  primary state highway in the U.S. state of South Carolina. It serves as an alternative bypass east of Florence and a connector route from Interstate 95 (I-95) to Myrtle Beach.

Route description
SC 327 has two identities: one as a rural two-lane highway bypassing Florence and the other as a divided four-lane highway connecting beach travelers from U.S. Route 76 (US 76) and US 301 and onto Myrtle Beach to I-95.

History
The route was established by 1942 as a new primary routing from US 52 in Effingham, to  SC 51 in Evergreen. In 1947 or 1948, SC 327 was extended east as a new primary routing from Evergreen to US 76/US 301 in Winona. By 1952, the Effingham to Evergreen section was paved, and later extended east to Clausen a year later; by 1958 the entire route was paved.

By 1958, SC 327 was rerouted from Claussen to US 76/US 301 in Mars Bluff; the old alignment was downgraded to secondary roads: National Cemetery Road (S-21-13) and Paper Mill Road (S-21-24). In 1971, SC 327 was extended north, overlapping with US 76/US 301 then north along existing roads to I-95.  In 1992, the US 76/US 301 to I-95 section was widened to a divided four-lane highway.

In 2010, funds were appropriated to improve the interchange at I-95; construction began the following year.

Junction list

See also

References

External links

 
 Mapmikey's South Carolina Highways Page: SC 320-329

327
Transportation in Florence County, South Carolina